Hairy phlox is a common name for several plants and may refer to:

Phlox amoena, native to the southeastern United States
Phlox hirsuta, native to Siskiyou County, California